Josef Straka (born February 11, 1978) is a Czech professional ice hockey centre. He currently plays for EHC Waldkraiburg of the Regionalliga. Straka was selected by the Calgary Flames in the 5th round (122nd overall) of the 1996 NHL Entry Draft.

Straka has spent several seasons in the Kontinental Hockey League (KHL).

He was a teammate with his namesake, the former NHL player Martin Straka, when Martin played with HC Plzen during the 2004–05 NHL lockout.

References

External links

1978 births
Living people
Ak Bars Kazan players
Calgary Flames draft picks
Motor České Budějovice players
Czech ice hockey centres
EHC Black Wings Linz players
HC Litvínov players
Lukko players
BK Mladá Boleslav players
Orli Znojmo players
People from Jindřichův Hradec
Piráti Chomutov players
HC Plzeň players
Severstal Cherepovets players
SCL Tigers players
HC Sparta Praha players
1. EV Weiden players
Avtomobilist Yekaterinburg players
Sportspeople from the South Bohemian Region
Czech expatriate ice hockey players in Finland
Czech expatriate ice hockey players in Russia
Czech expatriate ice hockey players in Switzerland
Czech expatriate ice hockey players in Germany
Czech expatriate sportspeople in Austria
Czech expatriate sportspeople in Italy
Expatriate ice hockey players in Italy
Expatriate ice hockey players in Austria